Feys is a surname. Notable people with the surname include:

 Debbrich Feys (born 1984), Belgian tennis player
 Matthias Feys (born 1985), Belgian footballer
 Robert Feys (1889–1961), Belgian logician and philosopher

See also
 Fays (disambiguation)
 Fey (disambiguation)